King Xie of Zhou (died 750 BCE) claimed sovereignty during the final stages of the Chinese Western Zhou Dynasty (1046–771 BCE). After King You of Zhou replaced the then Queen Shen with his concubine Bao Si, whilst at the same time substituting Yijiu as crown prince with Bao Si's son Bofu, Queen Shen's father, the Marquess of Shen became irate. Along with the State of Zeng and a band of Quanrong nomads he attacked the Zhou capital at Haojing. You was killed in the assault whereupon the Marquesses of Shēn and Zēng, together with Duke Wen of Xu enthroned Yijiu as King Ping of Zhou in the State of Shēn. At the same time, Jī Hàn, Duke of Guó, conspired with the Quanrong to elevate Yúchén to the throne as King Xie of Zhou. Thus began a period when there existed two parallel Zhou kings, a stalemate brought to an end in 750 BCE when Marquis Wen of Jin killed King Xie of Zhou.

Documented sources
According to the Zuo Zhuan: 
As far as King You was concerned, heaven had no pity for him, he was muddle-headed and not up to the job, having used criminal means to obtain the throne. King Xie violated the Mandate of Heaven, the vassal states usurped his power and he moved his capital to Jiaru.

The Xinian Annals of the recently unearthed Tsinghua Bamboo Slips gives his posthumous name as King Hui of Xie and records him as a younger brother of King You of Zhou.

Origin of the name
Tang Dynasty (618-907 CE) scholar Kong Yingda noted that the Bamboo Annals contained the words "Han, Duke of Guo, enthroned Yuchen at Xie" inferring that Xie was a place name. A further scroll in the Bamboo Annals records that Xie was a place although its location unknown. However, according to Kong Yingda other parts of the Bamboo Annals contradict this suggestion.

The New Book of Tang links Xie with Feng, Qi and Li as parts of the ancient province known as Yong Province, thus adding weight to the theory that Xie was a location.

Notes

References

Zhou dynasty kings
750 BC deaths
Year of birth unknown
8th-century BC Chinese monarchs